4-Nitrochlorobenzene is the organic compound with the formula ClC6H4NO2.  It is a pale yellow solid.  4-Nitrochlorobenzene is a common intermediate in the production of a number of industrially useful compounds, including common antioxidants found in rubber.  Other isomers with the formula ClC6H4NO2 include 2-nitrochlorobenzene and 3-nitrochlorobenzene.

Preparation
4-Nitrochlorobenzene is prepared industrially by nitration of chlorobenzene:

This reaction affords both the 2- and the 4-nitro derivatives, in about a 1:2 ratio. These isomers are separated by distillation. 4-Nitrochlorobenzene was originally prepared by the nitration of 4-bromochlorobenzene by Holleman and coworkers.

Applications
4-Nitrochlorobenzene is an intermediate in the preparation of a variety of derivatives.  Nitration gives 2,4-dinitrochlorobenzene, and 3,4-dichloronitrobenzene.   Reduction with iron metal gives 4-chloroaniline.  The electron-withdrawing nature of the appended nitro-group makes the benzene ring especially susceptible to nucleophilic aromatic substitution, unlike related chlorobenzene.  Thus, the strong nucleophiles hydroxide, methoxide, and amide displace chloride to give respectively 4-nitrophenol, 4-nitroanisole, 4-nitroaniline.

Another major use of 4-nitrochlorobenzene is its condensation with aniline to produce 4-nitrodiphenylamine.  Reductive alkylation of the nitro group affords secondary aryl amines, which are useful antioxidants for rubber.

Safety
The National Institute for Occupational Safety and Health considers 4-nitrochlorobenzene as a potential occupational carcinogen that may be absorbed through the skin. The Occupational Safety and Health Administration set a permissible exposure limit of 1 mg/m3, while the American Conference of Governmental Industrial Hygienists recommends an airborne exposure limit of 0.64 mg/m3, over a time-weighted average of eight hours.

References

Chloroarenes
Nitrobenzenes
Substances discovered in the 1910s